The Chicago Toy Soldier Show is a toy soldier and model figure trade show. It is held annually at the Hyatt Regency Hotel near Woodfield Mall, in the Chicago suburb of Schaumburg, Illinois. The show is organized by OTSN, Inc., publisher of Old Toy Soldier News. It is also known as the Old Toy Soldier Show or simply, the OTSN Show. The weekend event features 350 tables of toy soldiers and related collectibles. In 2005, the show attracted a crowd of 1,800 from all over the United States as well as other countries. It is one of the oldest and largest toy soldier shows in North America.

The 28th annual show was held on September 28, 2008. Future shows are scheduled for September 27, 2009, September 26, 2010, and September 25, 2011.

See also
Toy soldier
Tin soldier
Model figure
Army men
Dimestore soldiers

References

External links
 Chicago Toy Soldier Show Homepage

Trade shows in the United States
Schaumburg, Illinois
Tourist attractions in Cook County, Illinois